John D. Hannah (born c. 1940s) is an author and professor at Dallas Theological Seminary. His official title is "Distinguished Professor of Historical Theology, Research Professor of Theological Studies." He served as the department chair of Historical Theology for over twenty years and has taught at DTS since 1972.

Hannah is also an adjunct professor of Church History at Redeemer Seminary. He is also a member of the Alliance of Confessing Evangelicals.

Hannah is a popular and frequent conference speaker in the U.S. and in other countries. His publications include journals, books, audio materials, and computerized works. Hannah also serves on the boards of several organizations.

Education
 B.S., Philadelphia College of Bible (1967) 
 Th.M., Dallas Theological Seminary (1971)
 Th.D. (1974)
 M.A., Southern Methodist University (1980)
 Ph.D., University of Texas at Dallas (1988) 
 Postdoctoral study, Yale University (1993)

Works

Books

 revised edition of To God Be the Glory (2000)

Selected articles

External links
 Dallas Theological Seminary
 Westminster Seminary - Dallas
 Alliance of Confessing Evangelicals
 unofficial John Hannah web page (quotes and more)

Evangelical writers
Living people
Dallas Theological Seminary faculty
Year of birth missing (living people)